Hopewell is an unincorporated community in Harris County, Georgia, United States. It lies at an elevation of 840 feet (256 m).

References

Unincorporated communities in Harris County, Georgia
Unincorporated communities in Georgia (U.S. state)
Columbus metropolitan area, Georgia